Nadelitz is a village in the borough of Putbus on the German Baltic Sea island of Rügen. It is a district of the town Putbus in Landkreis Vorpommern-Rügen in Mecklenburg-Vorpommern.

Geography and Transport 
Nadelitz is located east of the town of Putbus on the Landesstraße 29. To the northeast runs the Bundesstraße 196. To the southwest is the 157 ha large nature reserve Goor-Muglitz.

Attractions 

 Fieldstone barn of the former estate (village street)
 Farm worker house (Dorfstraße 11)
 Farmers house (Dorfstraße 12)

See also 
Great dolmen

References

Vorpommern-Rügen
Putbus
Towns and villages on Rügen